Pantelhó is a town and one of the 125 Municipalities of Chiapas, in southern Mexico.

As of 2010, the municipality had a total population of 20,589, up from 16,262 as of 2005. It covers an area of 136.6 km².

As of 2010, the town of Pantelhó had a population of 6,888. Other than the town of Pantelhó, the municipality had 150 localities, the largest of which (with 2010 populations in parentheses) was: Aurora Esquipulas (2,046), classified as rural.

Government

Municipal presidents

See also 
2021 Pantelhó mass kidnapping

References 

Municipalities of Chiapas